The term summer colony is often used, particularly in the United States, to describe well-known resorts and upper-class enclaves, typically located near the ocean or mountains of New England or the Great Lakes. In Canada, the term cottage country is often preferred. Many of these historic communities are considered quiet bastions of old money, though some, such as The Hamptons, are now well known for their celebrity-driven social scenes. Additionally, their economies tend to be driven largely by this tourist trade, particularly those communities that are remote or on islands. Some summer colonies within sufficient proximity to an urban center, such as Lake Bluff, Illinois, may eventually become a year-round commuter town, while retaining the original character.

Well-known summer colonies in North America

United States

California

Balboa Island 
Big Sur 
Avalon (an area in Catalina Island)
Lake Tahoe 
Lower Russian River Area
Malibu Beach Colony 
Mendocino 
Montecito (an area in Santa Barbara)
Newport Peninsula (an area in Newport Beach)
Stinson Beach
Palm Springs

Connecticut

Blue Lake (an area in North Stonington)
Fenwick (an area in Old Saybrook)

Delaware

Bethany Beach
Dewey Beach
Fenwick Island
Lewes
Rehoboth Beach

Georgia

St. Simons
Sea Island
Jekyll Island

Illinois

Chain O'Lakes
Lake Bluff
Lake Forest

Maine

Bar Harbor (includes Northeast Harbor)
Boothbay Harbor
Camden (includes Rockport)
Islesboro (includes Dark Harbor)
Kennebunkport
North Haven
Vinalhaven
Winter Harbor, Grindstone Neck
York Harbor

Maryland

Cambridge
Easton
Ocean City
St. Michaels

Massachusetts

Cape Cod (Provincetown)
Duxbury
Gloucester
Great Barrington
Lenox
Manchester-by-the-Sea
Marblehead
Marion
Martha's Vineyard
Nantucket
Padanaram, South Dartmouth
Plymouth
Rockport
Beverly Farms

Michigan

Baldwin
Beaver Island
Charlevoix
Grand Haven
Harbor Springs
Mackinac Island
New Buffalo/Union Pier/Grand Beach
Lake Michigamme
Petoskey
Saugatuck
South Haven
Traverse City

Minnesota
Lake Minnetonka

Missouri
Lake of the Ozarks

New Hampshire

Cornish
Jackson
Holderness
Little Boar's Head
Sugar Hill
Wolfeboro

New Jersey
Listed from north to south:

Rumson
Elberon
Deal
Allenhurst
Loch Arbour
Spring Lake
Sea Girt
Barnegat Peninsula, including:
Point Pleasant Beach
Bay Head
Mantoloking
Lavallette
Island Heights
Long Beach Island, including:
Barnegat Light
Loveladies
North Beach
Harvey Cedars
Beach Haven
Brigantine
Longport
Avalon
Stone Harbor
Cape May

New York

Adirondacks
Chautauqua
East Marion
Fire Island
Fishers Island
The Hamptons, including (depending on definition):
Southampton
Water Mill
Bridgehampton
East Hampton
Sagaponack
Sag Harbor
Amagansett
Montauk
Lake George
Lake Placid
Thousand Islands

North Carolina
Listed from north to south:

Roaring Gap
Bodie Island including:
Carova
Corolla
Duck
Southern Shores
Kitty Hawk
Kill Devil Hills
Nags Head
Hatteras Island including:
Rodanthe
Waves
Salvo
Avon
Buxton
Frisco
Hatteras
Ocracoke Island
Crystal Coast including:
Atlantic Beach
Pine Knoll Shores
Indian Beach
Salter Path 
Emerald Isle
Topsail Island including:
North Topsail Beach
Surf City
Topsail Beach
Figure Eight Island
Wrightsville Beach
Pleasure Island (North Carolina) including:
Carolina Beach
Kure Beach
Bald Head Island
Oak Island
Holden Beach
Ocean Isle Beach

Ohio

Kelleys Island
Lakeside
Marblehead
Middle Bass Island
South Bass Island
Vermilion

Pennsylvania

Pocono Mountains
Erie

Rhode Island

Block Island
Little Compton
Narragansett
Newport
Watch Hill

Virginia

Colonial Beach
Chincoteague
Deltaville
Gwynn's Island
Hot Springs
Sandbridge
Warm Springs

Washington
Seabrook*
Rosario Resort and Spa, Orcas Island, was a hangout for John Wayne. The Wayne family summers were often spent in the waters off the Pacific Northwest coast, from Seattle to the San Juans.

Wisconsin

Door County
Eagle River
Green Lake
Lake Geneva
Madeline Island
Manitowish Waters
Twin Lakes

Canada

Prince Edward Island 
 Cavendish, Prince Edward Island

Nova Scotia 
 Bras d'Or Lake
 Annapolis Royal
 Lunenburg County

New Brunswick 
 St. Andrews

Quebec 
 Eastern Townships
 Laurentides
 Outaouais

Ontario 
 Central Ontario, including:
 Parry Sound-Muskoka-Haliburton
 Kawartha Lakes
 Bancroft & Northern Hastings County
 Ottawa Valley
 Eastern Ontario
 Rideau Lakes
 Prince Edward County
 Northwestern Ontario
 Kenora, Ontario

Manitoba 
 Whiteshell Provincial Park
 Eastern Manitoba
 Interlake
Riding Mountain National Park
Onanole
Wasagaming

Saskatchewan 
 Prince Albert National Park

Alberta 
 Banff, Alberta
 Canmore, Alberta

British Columbia 
 Shawnigan Lake, British Columbia
 Lake Country, British Columbia
 Whistler, British Columbia

See also
Hill station

References

Distribution of wealth
Summer Colony
Summer Colonies
Resorts
Summer